The District Council of Kimba is a local government area located on the northern Eyre Peninsula in South Australia. The district is mostly agricultural in nature, with the township of Kimba being the focal point of the district. With a number of towns positioned close to the Gawler Ranges, the district receives a modest amount of attention from tourists, who also stop by to see Kimba's Big Galah.

History
Pastoralists began colonising the area that would become the district in the early 1900s without many essential facilities such as road and water supplies. In 1913 the Port Lincoln Railway was extended to a new siding named 'Kimba', and two years later, the town of Kimba was officially proclaimed.

With new settlers to the area, the need for basic facilities was growing, the Kimba Vigilance Committee was established to lobby for the provision of these facilities. In 1925, the District Council of Kimba was established.

Since 1925, the district has grown in size, with a number of areas being added during 1936–1937, and again in 1967.

Localities

The district's focal point is the town and council seat of Kimba; it also includes the localities of Barna, Cootra, Cortlinye, Cunyarie, Kelly, Moseley, Panitya, Solomon, Wilcherry and Yalanda, and part of Buckleboo, Caralue, Lake Gilles, Koongawa, Pinkawillinie and Waddikee.

Facilities
The district has most essential facilities available including service stations, automotive repairers, laundromat, learning and business centre, accommodation, supermarkets, speciality shops, and many eating facilities.

Other community services include a medical centre, a hospital, a library and school

Council

Mayors and chairmen of Kimba

 Frank Roy Ferry (1930–1948)
 Alfred Charles Frick (1948-1950)
 Clifford Hamlet Richard Martin (1950-1957)
 Arthur Erwin Schaefer (1957-1965)
 Kenneth Charles Yates (1965-1967)
 Glen Gordon Cant (1967–1976)
 Hiram Kenneth Mayfield (1976–1980)
 Leo John Schaefer (1980–1984)

See also
Kimba Airport

References

External links
Council website
Local Government Association

Kimba
Eyre Peninsula